Midland Valley High School (MVHS) is a four-year high school located in Graniteville, South Carolina, United States. It is part of the Aiken County Public School District and is home of the Mustangs.

History
Midland Valley was founded in 1980 as the merger of two other schools, Langley Bath Clearwater and Leavelle McCampbell. Those schools became middle schools. MVHS celebrated its first graduating class in 1981.

Atheletics

State championships 
 Baseball: 1997
 Boys Basketball: 2015

References

External links
School website
School District website

Public high schools in South Carolina
Schools in Aiken County, South Carolina